Wolfgang Popp (born 19 May 1959) is a former professional tennis player from Germany. He enjoyed most of his tennis success while playing doubles. During his career, he won one doubles title and finished runner-up an additional three times. He achieved a career-high doubles ranking of World No. 76 in 1987.

Career finals

Doubles (1 win, 3 losses)

External links
 
 

1959 births
Living people
People from Neu-Isenburg
Sportspeople from Darmstadt (region)
West German male tennis players
Tennis people from Hesse
20th-century German people